Stuart Loudon (born 11 April 1988 in Uddingston) is a British rally co-driver and engineer. He was a co-driver to Gus Greensmith at the 2021 Rally Italia Sardegna for M-Sport Ford.

Personal life
Loudon was born in Uddingston. His grandfather is Boyd Tunnock, who owes Tunnock's. Loudon is also a qualified Rolls-Royce Aeronautical Engineer.

Rally results

* Season still in progress.

References

External links

  
 Stuart Loudon's e-wrc profile

1988 births
Living people
Automotive engineers
British rally co-drivers
People from Uddingston
World Rally Championship co-drivers